The Hun Sen Cup was the main football knockout tournament in Cambodia. The 2018 Hun Sen Cup was the 12th season of the Hun Sen Cup, the premier knockout tournament for association football clubs in Cambodia involving Cambodian League and provincial teams organized by the Football Federation of Cambodia.

Preah Khan Reach Svay Rieng were the defending champions, having beaten Nagaworld 3–0 in the previous season's final.

Hun Sen Cup 2018 divided into two stages, regional stage and national stage. 22 teams from the Capital and provinces playing in regional stage. 16 teams playing in national stage, 12 teams from Cambodian League with the last four teams from semi-finals of regional stage.

Regional stage

Group stage
Each group was played on a single round-robin basis at the pre-selected hosts. Mondul Kiri directed to round of 16 due to only one team in Group C. Group winners, runners-up, third places and the best three fourth-placed team advanced to round of 16.

Group A

Group B

Group C

Group D

Group E

Round of 16

Quarter-finals

Semi-finals

Finals

Awards

 Top goal scorer : Keo Naro of National Defense Ministry Youth (12 goals)
 Best goalkeeper : Hul Kimhuy of National Football Academy U18
 Best coach : Musashi Mizushima of National Football Academy U18

National stage
In national stage, matches start from round of 16 and play home-away basis.

Round of 16

First leg

Second leg

Quarter-finals

First leg

Second leg

Semi-finals

Finals

Awards

 Top goal scorer : Noun Borey of Police Commissary (9 goals)
 Player of the season : Noun Borey of Police Commissary
 Goalkeeper of the Season : Um Sereyroth of National Defense
 Coach of the season : Phea Sopheaktra of National Defense
 Fair Play: Police Commissary

See also
2018 Cambodian League

References

Hun Sen Cup seasons
2018 in Cambodian football
2018 Asian domestic association football cups